Mátyás Vedres (18 April 1943 – 23 May 2009) was a former Hungarian ice hockey goaltender. He played for the Hungary men's national ice hockey team at the 1964 Winter Olympics in Innsbruck.

References

1943 births
2009 deaths
Hungarian ice hockey goaltenders
Ice hockey players at the 1964 Winter Olympics
Olympic ice hockey players of Hungary
Ice hockey people from Budapest
Újpesti TE (ice hockey) players